Lieutenant General Jahan Dad Khan  (1929 – 2011 ) was an officer of the Pakistan Army and 14th Governor of Sindh, Pakistan. He was founder of Al-Shifa Trust. Jahan Dad Khan also served as chairman of the Pakistan Red Crescent Society.

Career

Military
Jahan Dad Khan passed out from Pakistan Military Academy Kakul in 1951 and commissioned in the Regiment of Artillery. He went through normal command, staff and instructional assignments during his military career. He retired in 1984 after 33 years of service.

Family 
Brother: Roedad Khan

Son: Shafi Khan 

Grandson: Ashraf Khan, Abdul Rasheed Khan, Abdul Waheed Khan, Abdul Hameed Khan and Shahzad Khan.

Great Grandson: Maaz Ahmed Khan, Ayan Ahmed Khan, Aslam Khan, Akram Khan

Books written
Pakistan Leadership Challenges
Depart with a Smile

Awards and decorations

References

Governors of Sindh
1929 births
2011 deaths